Seh Konarvan (also Romanized as Seh Konārvan) is a village in Qeblehi Rural District, in the Central District of Dezful County, Khuzestan Province, Iran. At the 2006 census, its population was 41, in 11 families.

References 

Populated places in Dezful County